Gerasimos is a Greek given name derived from Greek "γέρας" ("gΕras", "gift of honour, prize, reward"). The suffix -ιμος gives the meaning "the one who deserves honour". It can also be anglicized as "Gerassimos" or "Gerasimus". It can also be slavicized as Gerasim.

Saints
 Gerasimus of the Jordan, a Christian saint, monk, and abbot of the 5th century AD
 Gerasimos, Abbot of the Monastery of Saint Symeon, Christian author in Arabic, 12th/13th century
 Gerasimos of Euripos, Orthodox monk and disciple of Gregory of Sinai, 14th century
 Gerasimus of Kefalonia, a Christian saint and monk of the 16th century AD from the Greek island of Kefalonia

Orthodox bishops

Patriarchs of Constantinople
 Gerasimus I of Constantinople, Patriarch of Constantinople from 1320 to 1321
 Gerasimus II of Constantinople, Patriarch of Constantinople from 1673 to 1674
 Gerasimus III of Constantinople, Patriarch of Constantinople from 1794 to 1797

Other Orthodox patriarchs
 Gerasimus I of Jerusalem, Greek Orthodox Patriarch of Antioch and later Greek Orthodox Patriarch of Jerusalem in the late 19th century AD
 Gerasimos I, Serbian Patriarch, Archbishop of Peć and Serbian Patriarch (1574-1586)

Other Orthodox bishops
 Gerasimos Avlonites, a Greek Orthodox bishop of the Diocese of Arcadia in Crete in the 18th century AD
 Gerasimos Michaleas, a bishop of the Greek Orthodox church of America in the 21st century AD

Other people
 Gerasimos Vokos, a Greek writer
 Gerasimos Arsenis, a Greek politician
 Gerasimos Skiadaresis, a Greek actor

See also
 Gerasim
 Patriarch Gerasimus (disambiguation)
 Erasmus (disambiguation)

References

Greek-language given names
Greek masculine given names